Albert James Matthew Wright (6 February 1871 – 7 March 1960), known as Bertie Wright, was a British actor of the silent era. Wright was born in Blackburn, Lancashire, England, and died on 7 March 1960, in Sydney, New South Wales, Australia.

Partial filmography
 A Little Bit of Fluff (1919)
 General John Regan (1921)
 The Wheels of Chance (1922)
 A Sailor Tramp (1922)
 Little Brother of God (1922)
 Young Lochinvar (1923)
 The Royal Oak (1923)
 The Rest Cure (1923)

References

External links
 
 Partial filmography at the British Film Institute

1871 births
1960 deaths
English male film actors
English male silent film actors
Male actors from Lancashire
20th-century English male actors